Laodicea; also transliterated as Laodikeia or Laodiceia was a Hellenistic city in Mesopotamia.  Pliny (vi. 30) places Laodicea along with Seleucia and Artemita. Laodicea's precise location is unknown, but it is in modern-day Iraq.

See also
List of ancient Greek cities
Nahavand

External links
Smith, William (editor); Dictionary of Greek and Roman Geography, "Laodiceia", London, (1854)

Seleucid colonies
Former populated places in Iraq